The Naturmobil is a horse-powered vehicle for travel on paved roads. The vehicle is controlled by a driver in a similar way to a motor-driven vehicle, with the horse inside the vehicle on a treadmill. The treadmill also charges batteries which will power the vehicle if the horse needs a break.

The vehicle was invented by Abdolhadi Mirhejazi, an Iranian engineer, in 2008. At least one veterinarian, Dr. Matt Pietrak, has concerns for the horse's wellbeing while powering the vehicle.

References

External links
official site

Horse transportation
Animal-powered vehicles